Vissuvere is a village in Kolga-Jaani Parish, Viljandi County, in central Estonia. According to Estonia Census 2000, the village had a population of 73.

References

Villages in Viljandi County